Gompholobium huegelii, commonly known as common wedge-pea is a species of flowering plant in the family Fabaceae and is endemic to south-eastern Australia. It is an erect or spreading shrub with trifoliate leaves and cream-coloured to yellow and greenish, pea-like flowers.

Description

Taxonomy and naming
Gompholobium huegelii was first formally described in 1837 by George Bentham in Stephan Endlicher's Enumeratio plantarum quas in Novae Hollandiae ora austro-occidentali ad fluvium Cygnorum et in sinu Regis Georgii collegit Carolus Liber Baro de Hügel. The specific epithet (huegelii) honours Charles von Hügel.

Distribution
Common wedge-pea grows in heathland and forest in the far south-east of Queensland through the coast, tablelands and western slopes of New South Wales, the higher rainfall areas of Victoria and to Tasmania where it is widespread and common.

References

huegelii
Mirbelioids
Fabales of Australia
Flora of Queensland
Flora of New South Wales
Flora of the Australian Capital Territory
Flora of Victoria (Australia)
Flora of Tasmania
Taxa named by George Bentham
Plants described in 1837